Tural Humbatovich Humbatov (born January 24, 1994) is an Azerbaijani former footballer who is last known to have played as a defender for Dečić.

Career

Before the second half of 2012/13, Humbatov signed for Moldovan side Nistru from the youth academy of Zenit, one of Russia's most successful clubs, where he made 8 league appearances and scored 0 goals.

In 2015, Humbatov signed for Shuvalan in Azerbaijan, where he made 52 league appearances and scored 2 goals.

In 2017, he signed for Macedonian team Pobeda after trialing for Rostov in the Russian top flight.

Before the second half of 2017/18, Humbatov signed for Dečić in Montenegro after receiving offers from Slovenia and Greece.

References

External links
 
 

Azerbaijani footballers
Living people
Expatriate footballers in North Macedonia
Expatriate footballers in Montenegro
Association football defenders
Azerbaijani expatriate footballers
Moldovan Super Liga players
FK Pobeda players
FK Dečić players
AZAL PFK players
Shamakhi FK players
Araz-Naxçıvan PFK players
FC Nistru Otaci players
Montenegrin First League players
Macedonian First Football League players
Azerbaijan Premier League players
Expatriate footballers in Moldova
1994 births